The Kaweah-class oiler was a class of oil tankers of United States Navy during the Second World War.

Development 
Four oilers were ordered for construction by the William Cramp & Sons, Philadelphia. These ships were the remaining four 1917 program oilers, 5450/14,500-ton tankers built to USSB Design 1128 between 1919 and 1921. Similar in size and speed to the Patoka-class, the Alameda and Kaweah-classes also served principally as transport tankers.

Ships of class

Citations